Miguel Escalona Verano (born 22 November 1983 in Logroño, La Rioja) is a Spanish former professional footballer who played as a goalkeeper. He later worked as a specialist goalkeeping coach at Elche CF.

Club statistics

References

External links

1983 births
Living people
Sportspeople from Logroño
Spanish footballers
Footballers from La Rioja (Spain)
Association football goalkeepers
Segunda División players
Segunda División B players
Tercera División players
CD Basconia footballers
Bilbao Athletic footballers
Athletic Bilbao footballers
Racing de Ferrol footballers
Logroñés CF footballers
CD Guijuelo footballers
CD Lugo players
CD Guadalajara (Spain) footballers
UCAM Murcia CF players
Cypriot First Division players
AEK Larnaca FC players
Spain under-21 international footballers
Spanish expatriate footballers
Expatriate footballers in Cyprus
Spanish expatriate sportspeople in Cyprus
Association football coaches